Anna-Maria Gradante (born 26 December 1976 in Remscheid) is a German judoka. She won a bronze medal in the extra-lightweight (-48 kg) division at the 2000 Summer Olympics, her last match being with Brazilian Mariana Martins.

External links
 
 
 

1976 births
Living people
German female judoka
Judoka at the 2000 Summer Olympics
Olympic judoka of Germany
Olympic bronze medalists for Germany
Olympic medalists in judo
Medalists at the 2000 Summer Olympics
People from Remscheid
Sportspeople from Düsseldorf (region)
20th-century German women
21st-century German women